Grindcrusher is a CD/LP released by Earache Records in 1989, showcasing nine of the label's bands. It contained a number of pioneer grindcore and death metal groups such as Napalm Death, Bolt Thrower, Morbid Angel, Carcass and Repulsion. This compilation was later rereleased in 1991 as Grindcrusher: the Ultimate Earache, augmented with 14 extra tracks by the likes of Entombed and Nocturnus.

Track listing
Morbid Angel – "Chapel of Ghouls"
Repulsion – "Radiation Sickness"
Carcass – "Exhume to Consume" (this version is different from the one that appears on the LP Symphonies of Sickness)
Godflesh – "Streetcleaner" (minus the intro that appears on the LP Streetcleaner)
Terrorizer – "Dead Shall Rise"
Hellbastard – "Justly Executed"
Carnage – "Malignant Epitaph"
Naked City – "Osaka Bondage"
Filthy Christians – "Extremely Bad Breath"
Old Lady Drivers – "Colostomy Grab Bag"
Intense Degree – "I've Got A Cure"
Sore Throat – "Horrendify and Kill"
Napalm Death – "Malicious Intent"
Entombed – "But Life Goes On"
Nocturnus – "BC/AD"
Bolt Thrower – "World Eater"
Lawnmower Deth – "Satan's Trampoline"
Cadaver – "Hypertrophian"
Sweet Tooth – "Fat City"
Mighty Force – "Thrashing a Dead House"
Spazztic Blurr – "He-Not-A-Home-Me-Marco"
Heresy – "Release"
Unseen Terror – "Divisions"
Napalm Death – "You Suffer"

References

1989 compilation albums
Thrash metal compilation albums
Death metal compilation albums
Grindcore compilation albums
Earache Records compilation albums
Record label compilation albums